Anomis auragoides is a moth of the family Noctuidae first described by Achille Guenée in 1852. It is found in central and southern Africa, and is known from Cape Verde, Uganda, the Democratic Republic of the Congo, South Africa, Madagascar, the Comoros and Réunion.

The wingspan is about 28–30 mm.

References

Moths described in 1852
Moths of Cape Verde
Moths of the Comoros
Moths of Africa
Moths of Madagascar
Moths of Réunion